Cailloux-sur-Fontaines is a commune in the Metropolis of Lyon in Auvergne-Rhône-Alpes region in eastern France.

References

Communes of Lyon Metropolis